Pseudoeurycea cochranae is a species of salamander in the family Plethodontidae. It is endemic to the Sierra Madre del Sur and Sierra Madre de Oaxaca of central and west-central Oaxaca, Mexico.

Etymology
The specific name cochranae honors Doris Mable Cochran, an American herpetologist.

Habitat
It is a terrestrial salamander that hides under bark and in leaf-litter. It tolerates some degree of habitat disturbance and is sometimes found in rural gardens and selectively logged lots. It is threatened by habitat loss caused by extensive agricultural expansion, human settlements, and logging.

References

cochranae
Endemic amphibians of Mexico
Fauna of the Sierra Madre del Sur
Fauna of the Sierra Madre de Oaxaca
Amphibians described in 1943
Taxa named by Edward Harrison Taylor
Taxonomy articles created by Polbot